Derek  is a 2008 British documentary film directed by Isaac Julien. It uses archive footage to depict the life of Derek Jarman.

Cast 
 Derek Jarman - Himself (archive footage)
 Tilda Swinton - Narrator (voice)
 Margaret Thatcher - Herself (archive footage)

References

External links 
 

British documentary films
2008 documentary films
2008 films
2000s English-language films
2000s British films